The Warrwa language is an extinct Australian Aboriginal language which was formerly spoken in the Derby Region of Western Australia near Broome, Western Australia.  It may have been a dialect of Nyigina. It was also known as Warrawai or Warwa.

Grammar
Warrwa employed a variety of word orders grammatically. Attributive adjectives and possessive adjectives preceded the nouns they modified.

References 

Nyulnyulan languages